Coleophora quadrilineella is a moth of the family Coleophoridae. It is found in the United States, including Kentucky.

The larvae feed on the seeds of Juncus species. They create a tubular silken seed case.

References

quadrilineella
Moths of North America
Moths described in 1878